An all-time medal table for all Pan American Games from 1951 to 2019 is tabulated below. PASO (Pan American Sports Organization) itself does not publish all-time tables, and publishes unofficial tables only per single Games. This table was thus compiled by adding up single entries from the PASO database.

The results are attributed to the IOC country code as currently displayed by the IOC database. Usually, a single code corresponds to a single National Olympic Committee (NOC). When different codes are displayed for different years, medal counts are combined in the case of a simple change of IOC code (such as from TRT to TRI for Trinidad and Tobago) or simple change of country name (such as from British Honduras to Belize). As the medals are attributed to each NOC, not all totals include medals won by athletes from that country for another NOC, such as before independence of that country (see individual footnotes for special cases such as combined teams). Names in italic are national entities that no longer exist.

NOCs
The table is pre-sorted by the name of each Olympic Committee, but can be displayed as sorted by any other column, such as the total number of gold medals or total number of overall medals. To sort by gold, silver, and then bronze (as used unofficially by the IOC) and by most broadcasters outside the US and Canada sort first by the bronze column, then the silver, and then the gold. The country of the Netherlands Antilles is listed in italics because it is a national entity that no longer exists.

Ranked medal table

References